Peiron (ペーロンPeiron) is a traditional Japanese paddled watercraft sport that has its roots in Chinese dragon boat racing.  

The term Peiron is derived from the Chinese expression 白龍 (Bai Long (white dragon)).

Dragon boat racing